The 16th TVyNovelas Awards, is an Academy of special awards to the best soap operas and TV shows. The awards ceremony took place on 1998 in Mexico D.F. The ceremony was televised in Mexico by El canal de las estrellas.
 
Fernando Colunga, Gabriela Spanic and Sebastián Ligarde hosted the show. Esmeralda and Pueblo chico, infierno grande won 4 awards, the most for the evening (Esmeralda also won in the category of Best Telenovela). Other winners Te sigo amando won 3 awards, Mirada de mujer and Salud, dinero y amor won 2 awards and Alguna vez tendremos alas, El alma no tiene color, Huracán, María Isabel and Mi pequeña traviesa won one each.

Summary of awards and nominations

Winners and nominees

Telenovelas

Others

References 

TVyNovelas Awards
TVyNovelas Awards
TVyNovelas Awards
TVyNovelas Awards ceremonies